Betonica macrantha, formerly Stachys macrantha, known as big betony, is a species of flowering plant in the mint family Lamiaceae. It is native to the Caucasus, northeastern Turkey, and northwestern Iran. Spikes of hooded purplish-pink flowers are borne throughout summer.

The Latin specific epithet macrantha means "large-flowered".

The cultivars 'Robusta', 'Superba', and 'Violacea' have gained the Royal Horticultural Society’s Award of Garden Merit.

References

macrantha
Flora of Turkey
Flora of the Caucasus
Flora of Iran
Garden plants of Asia